Liolaemus fabiani, also known commonly as Fabian's lizard, Yanez's tree iguana, and lagartija de Fabián in Spanish, is a species of lizard in the family Liolaemidae. The species is native to Chile.

Etymology
The specific name, fabiani, is in honor of Chilean ecologist Fabián Jaksic.

Geographic range
L. fabiani is endemic to the Salar de Atacama, the Atacama salt flat, in northern Chile.

The species was first described by José L. Yáñez and Herman Núñez in 1983, from a sample collected at a high elevation, near San Pedro de Atacama in Llano de Vilama in September 1981 by the Chilean National Museum of Natural History.

Habitat

Description
Principle diagnostic features of L. fabiani are: "subtriangular head with temporal and occipital regions more prominent than in other species of the genus; dorsal humeral scales smooth and triangular; color pattern ornamented with red and black spots."

Diet
L. fabiani preys upon mosquitoes and other insects.

Reproduction
L. fabiani is viviparous.

References

Further reading
Núñez H, Yáñez J (1984). "Abas y Velosaura nuevos géneros de lagartos iguanidae y proposiciones sistemáticas respecto de los géneros aliados (Reptilia Squamata) ". Boletín del Museo Nacional de Historia Natural, Santiago de Chile 40: 91–95. (Abas fabiani, new combination). (in Spanish).
Ramírez-Leyton G, Pincheira-Donoso D (2005). Fauna del Altiplano y Desierto Atacama: Vertebrados de la Provincia de El Loa. Santiago de Chile: Phrynosaura Ediciones. 395 pp. (in Spanish).

External links

Photograph of L. fabiani.

fabiani
Lizards of South America
Endemic fauna of Chile
Reptiles of Chile
Atacama Desert
Reptiles described in 1983